Laura Viviana Agundiz Pérez (born 6 August 1968) is a Mexican politician from the National Action Party. From 2010 to 2012 she served as Deputy of the LXI Legislature of the Mexican Congress representing Guanajuato.

References

1968 births
Living people
Politicians from Guanajuato
Women members of the Chamber of Deputies (Mexico)
National Action Party (Mexico) politicians
21st-century Mexican politicians
21st-century Mexican women politicians
Mexican architects
Mexican women architects
Universidad de Guanajuato alumni
Universidad del Valle de Atemajac alumni
People from Comonfort
Deputies of the LXI Legislature of Mexico
Members of the Chamber of Deputies (Mexico) for Guanajuato